AH and variants may refer to:
 Ah!, an exclamation
 AH (Anno Hegirae), Latin for Islamic "in the year of the Hijra" similar to the Latin for the Christian year Anno Domini

Music
 "Ah", song by Charles Aznavour written by Charles Aznavour and José Lucchesi 1954
 "Ah" (song), a Japanese song by Superfly
 "Ah", a song by the Turkish band Duman 2002

Games and literature
 Achievement Hunter, a Texas-based online video gaming community
 Adam Hughes, a comic artist who signs his work "AH!"
 Alternate history, a subgenre of speculative fiction
 Arcana Heart, a video game series
 Avalon Hill, makers of military-themed board games

Places
 Anhui, a province of China (Guobiao abbreviation AH)
 Austria-Hungary, a former European empire

Aviation
 Air Algérie IATA designator
 Artificial Horizon, an attitude indicator, a cockpit instrument (Aviation)
 Bell AH-1 Cobra, a model of attack helicopter
 Boeing AH-64 Apache, a model of attack helicopter

Computing
 AH register, the high byte of an X86 16-bit AX register
 Authentication Header (AH), a part of the IPsec protocol suite

Disease, ventilation and electricity
 Adenomatous hyperplasia; see endometrial adenomatous hyperplasia and atypical adenomatous hyperplasia
 Air handler, or air handling unit (AHU), a device used to condition and circulate air
 Ampere hour, a unit of electric charge

Other fields
 Aegyptiaca Helvetica, an archaeological journal published by Schwabe (publisher)
 After-hours trading or extended-hours trading in stock trading
 Ah (digraph), a digraph used in Taa language orthography
 Albert Heijn, a Dutch supermarket chain owned by Ahold
 Alkotmányvédelmi Hivatal, the Constitution Protection Office, a Hungarian intelligence agency
 Asian Highway Network, a project among countries in Asia and Europe to improve the highway systems in Asia
 Hospital ship (US Navy hull classification symbol AH)

See also
 AAH (disambiguation)
 AHH (disambiguation)
 A-ha, a New Wave/Synthpop band from Norway
 Aa! Japanese band